Bluestars is the debut studio album by American R&B group Pretty Ricky. It was released on May 24, 2005 by Atlantic Records and Bluestar Entertainment. The record serves as their second release under their record label, called Bluestar Entertainment. The album was supported by three singles: "Grind with Me", "Your Body", and "Nothing but a Number". Bluestars debuted at number 16 on the US Billboard 200 and sold 56,000 units in its first week. To date, the album was certified gold by the Recording Industry Association of America (RIAA).

Critical reception

AllMusic's Andy Kellman felt that Pretty Ricky's sexual content paled in comparison to fellow artists like Usher and the Ying Yang Twins due to lackluster writing, concluding that, "[T]he group has more talent than it leads you to believe. Maybe they won't be so hungry for street credibility on album number two." Azeem Ahmed of musicOMH also found the sex jams monotonous after the fourth track and came across as "vain attempts" to copy Usher and 112, but gave credit to "Grill 'Em" and "Chevy" for taking the group out of their usual soundscape to elevate their musical range and material, concluding that, "Had Bluestars demonstrated a desire beyond mere commercial success and focused on credibility this could have been an impressive piece of work. Instead it is a product that will command sales but will suffer the test of time."

Track listing

Charts

Weekly charts

Year-end charts

Certifications

References

2005 debut albums
Pretty Ricky albums
Atlantic Records albums
Albums produced by Jim Jonsin
Albums produced by Troy Taylor (record producer)